Sir Lloyd Marshall Dorfman  (born 25 August 1952) is a British entrepreneur and philanthropist. He founded Travelex (today part of Finablr), the world's largest retailer of foreign exchange.

According to The Sunday Times Rich List in 2020, Dorfman is worth £720 million.

Early life and education
Dorfman's family were Jewish immigrants from eastern Europe who came to London before The Great War. He was educated at St Paul's. He did not attend university.

Career
In 1976, Dorfman started his own currency exchange business from one small shop based in Southampton Row in central London. The company spread to ports overseas, initially in the Netherlands and Belgium. In 1986, Dorfman won Travelex a landmark contract as the first non-bank foreign exchange provider at the newly opened Heathrow Terminal 4. The company expanded into airports worldwide, opening in the USA in 1989 shortly followed by Australia in 1990.

The £440m acquisition of Thomas Cook's Global & Financial Services business in March 2001 made Travelex the world's largest non-bank foreign exchange business. Dorfman began to develop the presence of the company in Asia, starting with Japan and spreading to India in 2003 and China in 2004.

Travelex sold its card programme management business to MasterCard for £290 million in 2011, and then its Global Business Payments to Western Union for £606 million. In 2014, an agreement was reached to sell Travelex to shareholders in Abu Dhabi; Dorfman however still retains a 5% shareholding.

Travelex pioneered sponsorship deals including Travelex Cheap Ticket Season at the National Theatre, as well as sponsoring the winning World Cup teams for Australian Cricket in 2003 and England Rugby the same year.

Current business activity
Dorfman is a minority shareholder in The Office Group, the British pioneers of co-working spaces. He was previously chairman and majority shareholder of the company from 2010 to 2017, before a £500 mn deal with Blackstone in June 2017. The Group has over 30 buildings across central London. Its clients include thousands of small businesses and start-ups as well as larger companies. In 2014, he co-founded and became chairman of Doddle, a retail business enabling people to collect, return and send their online shopping from train stations and elsewhere. Dorfman is also a lead investor and board member of the London Theatre Company.

Dorfman has a number of other business interests, including shareholder and director of the London Theatre Company and Ben Ainslie Racing’s America’s Cup Challenge. He sits on Mayor of London Sadiq Khan's Business Advisory Board.

In April 2020, he added a £3 million investment in Snoop to his portfolio, an app created by former Virgin Money boss Dame Jayne-Anne Gadhia.

Philanthropy 
Dorfman is chairman of youth and enterprise charity the Prince’s Trust, having joined the charity's Council in 2007. He is also the chairman of Prince’s Trust International, which aims to help unemployed young people around the globe into education, training and work.

In addition, he is a trustee of the Royal Opera House, of the Royal Academy Trust and of JW3; deputy chairman of the Community Security Trust, and was a governor of St Paul's School from 2005 to 2016.

He was on the board of the Royal National Theatre from 2007 to 2015, and the National Theatre's Cottesloe was renamed the Dorfman Theatre in 2013 following a gift of £10 million towards the National Theatre Future redevelopment project. Dorfman joined the board of BAFTA in 2017.

In 2017, following a gift from the Dorfman Foundation, the Royal Academy announced the launch of two new international architecture awards, and the restoration of the Senate Rooms in Burlington Gardens to house a new architecture space and café.

Honours and awards 
In 2001 Dorfman was the winner of the Consumer Business Category in the UK "Entrepreneur of the Year" awards sponsored by Ernst & Young, Citibank and The Times. In 2002 he received the British American Chamber of Commerce's UK Entrepreneurial Award, and the Institute of Economic Affairs' Free Enterprise Award. In 2007 he received the Honorary Australian of the Year in the UK award.

He was appointed Commander of the Order of the British Empire (CBE) in the 2008 Birthday Honours for services to business and charity. He was knighted in the 2018 Birthday Honours.

In 2011, he was awarded The Prince of Wales Medal for Arts Philanthropy. He is an honorary fellow of St Peter's College, Oxford and an Honorary Bencher of Lincoln's Inn He was awarded an honorary doctorate by Buckingham University in 2016.

He was appointed Commander of the Royal Victorian Order (CVO) in the 2022 Birthday Honours for services to the Prince's Trust.

Personal life
He is married with three children, and lives in London.

References

Honorary Fellows of St Peter's College, Oxford
Commanders of the Order of the British Empire
People educated at St Paul's School, London
British Jews
Living people
1952 births
Place of birth missing (living people)
Businesspeople from London
Knights Bachelor
Commanders of the Royal Victorian Order